We Don't Have Each Other is the debut studio album from American folk rock project Aaron West and the Roaring Twenties, released on July 8, 2014 through Hopeless Records.

Background
Dan Campbell announced the Aaron West side project on May 22, 2014, releasing "You Ain't No Saint" as the first single on May 27, 2014. The album's second single, "Divorce and the American South,"  was released on June 10, 2014, followed by the album on July 8, 2014.

Track listing

Personnel
Credits from Discogs.

Aaron West and the Roaring Twenties
 Dan "Soupy" Campbell – Vocals, Guitar, Harmonica, Photography (Additional)

Additional musicians
 Arthur "Ace" Enders - Guitar, Bass, Lap Steel Guitar, Banjo, Keyboards, Vocals
 Dave Heck - Trombone
 Mikey Kelley - Trumpet
 Mike Kennedy - Drums
 John Ryan - Saxophone

Artwork
 Allison Weiss - Layout
 Mitchell Wojcik - Photography

Production
 Arthur "Ace" Enders - Producer, Engineer, Mixing
 Bill Henderson - Mastering

References

2014 albums
Hopeless Records albums